Siwan district of Bihar, India comprises only one sub-division, Siwan, which is divided into 19 Blocks and has a total of 1,530 villages. There are 95 uninhabited villages (out of 1,530 total villages) in the district of Siwan.

This is list of villages of Siwan district according to respective blocks.

Andar 

 Ailashgarh Khas
 Amnaura
 Andar
 Arakpur
 Arazi Barwa
 Asaon
 Balia
 Bangra
 Belahi
 Bhaurajpur
 Bhitauli
 Bikrampur Diara
 Chandauli
 Chhajwa
 Chitaur
 Dehunra
 Deuriya
 Dharamkhor
 Diara Ailashgarh Naubarar
 Diara Maniara Tukra 1
 Doaen
 Fatehpur
 Fazilpur
 Fazilpur Deuriya
 Gahilapur
 Gaura
 Ghataila
 Hakma Hata
 Hujhujipur
 Jaijor
 Jamalpur
 Kanhpakar
 Katwar
 Khardara
 Khartari urf Hariram chak
 Kherhai
 Khodai chak
 Kismat Barwa
 Kodaila
 Mahaji Gondauni
 Mahammadpur
 Manpur Pateji
 Masudaha
 Mirpur
 Modassilpur
 Moglanipur
 Nahuni
 Pachokhar
 Pandapali
 Parari Lachchhiram
 Pareji
 Patar
 Pateji
 Pipra
 Pirari Khemraj
 Rakauli
 Rakauli Khap
 Sadalpur
 Sahsaraon
 Salahpur
 Sanchipur
 Siuri
 Sonkara Auwal
 Sonkara sani
 Sultanpur
 Tiae
 Utarwar

Barharia 

 Ahirni
 Alampur
 Alapur
 Asapur
 Athkhambha
 Aurai
 Babhan Bara
 Babu Hata
 Babu Hata
 Badarzamin
 Bahadurpur
 Bahuara qadir
 Balapur
 Bangra
 Bangra Buzurg
 Barahpur
 Barharia
 Barsara
 Bhabhopali
 Bhaday
 Bhagwanpur
 Bhalua
 Bhalui
 Bhaluwara
 Bhelpur
 Bhimpur
 Bhopatpur
 Bishambharpur
 Bishunpura
 Chain Chhapra
 Chainpur Alinagar
 Chak Pararauna
 Chandan Chhapra
 Chanri
 Chap Kanhauli
 Chaukihasan Chauki Makhdum
 Chhaka Tola
 Chhatisi
 Daniayl-pur
 Dhanaon
 Dharajpur
 Dumri
 Enaetchhapra
 Fakhrudinpur
 Gambhir Hata
 Girddharpur
 Gopalpur
 Habibpur
 Hardiya
 Hardo Bara
 Hariharpur Lalgarh
 Harpur
 Hathgain
 Indauli Khas
 Indauli Siraj
 Jagarnathpur
 Jagatpur
 Jagdishpur
 Jiadi Tola
 Jogapur
 Kail
 Kaluchhapra
 Kanahar
 Kanhauli
 Khanpur
 Khizar Chak
 Khori Pakar Jaddi
 Khori Pakar Nilami
 Koiri Tola
 Kuahi
 Kurwa
 Kurwa
 Kutub Chhapra
 Lachhmi Chak
 Lakri
 Lakri Dargah
 Lala Hata
 Lauan
  Madhaupur
 Mahal
 Mahamadpur
 Mahammadpur
 Mahbub Chhapra
 Mahmudpur
 Mananpura
 Mansahata
 Mathia Patarhatha
 Mathurapur
 Mira Chhapra
 Narharpur
 Nasir Chhapra
 Nasopur Saraia
 Nawalpur
 Nirkhi Chhapra
 Paharpur
 Paintalis
 Pakri
 Pakri Sultan
 Pakwalya
 Paltu Hata
 Panrwa
 Paranpur
 Pararauna
 Patarhatha
 Patti Bhalua
 Piprahi
 Puraina
 Qismat Surwalia
 Rachho Pali
 Raghunathpur
 Rampur
 Ranipur
 Rasulpur
 Rohara
 Rudar Hata
 Sadarpur
 Sahba Chak
 Salahpur
 Sanwalhata
 Sauna
 Shampur
 Shekhpura
 Siari
 Siari Khurd
 Sikandarpur
 Siswa
 Siurajpur
 Siurajpur
 Sundarpur
 Surahia
 Surahia
 Surwalia
 Tetahli
 Tilbhiriya Kalam
 Tilbhiriya Khurd
 Tilsandi
 Tilsandi
 Usri
 Usuri Indauli
 Wasilpur

Basantpur 

 Babhnauli
 Bagaha
 Bagahi
 Balthara
 Barhoga Khurd
 Barwa Kalan
 Barwa Khurd
 Basantpur
 Basaon
 Bishunpura
 Dhanaua
 Haraypur
 Hari Aman
 Hussepur
 Jankinagar
 Kanhauli
 Karahi Kalan
 Karahi Khurd
 Karahi Mathia
 Khori Pakar
 Kukumpur
 Laheji
 Mathia
 Molnapur
 Murwar
 Nagauli
 Rajapur
 Rampur
 Sahar Kola
 Sahilpatti
 Sarea Sirikant
 Sekhpura
 Semardah
 Seria
 Shampur
 Shampur Khap
 Sipah
 Sonurukha
 Surajpura
 Usri
 Usuri

Bhagwanpur Hat 

 Aiman Shankarpur
 Arazi Balaha
 Arazi Nagwa
 Aruan
 Badarzamin
 Bagahi
 Bahadurpur
 Bakhtauli
 Balaha
 Bankajua
 Bankat
 Banpura
 Bansohi
 Baramh Asthan
 Barka Gaon
 Bhagwanpur Hat
 Bherwanian
 Bhikhampur
 Bhikhampur
 Bilaspur
 Bira Bankat
 Birt Bagahi
 Bithuna
 Chainpur
 Chaiyan Pali
 Chakbirdi
 Chakia
 Chakia tola
 Chaurasi
 Chokmunda
 Chorauli
 Chorauli Banwe
 Chorman
 Dehri
 Dharamraj
 Dhonrhpur
 Dilshadpur
 Gaziapur
 Gobinapur
  Goiya Nar
 Gopalpur
 Hasanpura
 Hilsanr
 Hilsanr tola
 Hulsara
 Jagdishpur
 Jalpurwa
 Juaphar
 Juaphar tola
 Junedpur
 Kauriya
 Khapkat
 Kherhwa
 Konrar
 Korigawan
 Machhagra
 Madar Khurd
 Maghri
 Mahammadpur
 Mahna
 Mairi Dalip
 Mairi Makhsuspur
 Mairi Sudama
 Makhdumpur
 Manan Patti
 Manrar Kalan
 Matanpura
 Mira Hata
 Mirjumla
 Mirzapur Bahiyara
 Mohamda
 Morakhap
 Morakhas
 Mundipur
 Munra
 Naduwa
 Nagwa
 Nauwa tola
 Paniya Dih
 Piprahia
 Rajapur
 Rampur
 Rampur
 Rampur Digar
 Rampur Digar
 Rampur Khas
 Rampur Khas
 Rampur Lauwa
 Rasulpur
 Ratan Panrauli
 Ratan Panrauli
 Ratauli
 Sadiha
 Saghar Sultanpur
 Sahsa
 Sahsaraon
 Sajot
 Salempur
 Salempur
 Sani Bagahi
 Sankri
 Sarahri
 Saray Panrauli
 Sarea
 Saripatti
 Shankarpur
 Singhauli
 Sipar
 Sonbarsa
 Sonhani
 Sughri
 Suhpur
 Sultanpur
 Tarwar

Darauli 

 Agsara
 Amarpur
 Babhnauli
 Balahu
 Bali  punak
 Balia
 Bandhai
 Barheya punak
 Basuapur
 Bauna
 Belaon
 Belsui
 Bharsanda
 Bhitauli
 Bhothia
 Bilak
 Biswania
 Chakri
 Chandaur
 Daraili
 Darauli
 Diara  Harnatanr
 Diara Darauli
 Diara Maniar Tukra  II
 Diara Maniar Tukra I
 Diara Mohazi Kashidatta
 Diara Nauabad
 Diara kashidat
 Diyara Keotalia
 Diyara Mauza Amarpur
 Dobhia
 Don Buzurg
 Don Khurd
 Duba
 Dumarahar Buzurg
 Dumarahar Khurd
 Dumarahar Khurd Diara
 Dumrahar Diara
 Extension of Bilak Diara
 Gangpalia
 Garden
  Gauri
  Gauri
 Gopalpur
 Gosopali
 Gumawar
 Harnatanr
 Harnatanra
 Hathauri
 Indrak Chak
 Kanaila
 Kanhauli
 Karanpura
 Karmaha
 Karmaul
 Karnai
 Karom
 Kasihari
 Kasila pachbenian
 Kewtalia
 Khairati  Udho
 Khairati Dalip
 Khap  punak Buzurg
 Khap Pataua
 Khap Punak Buzurg
 Khor
 Kishunpali
 Kumhti
 Lachhuman chak
 Lenja
 Loharpura
 Lokaichhapra
 Mahpalwa
 Mahuja
 Majhaulia
 Marera
 Mathia
 Mathia Punak Buzurg
 Misraulia
 Munjwania
 Munra
 Mura  Khap
 Murakaramwar
 Narauli
 Narayanpur
 Nepura
 Netwar
 Oini
 Parasia
 Parmanandpur
 Pataua Buzurg
 Paterha
 Patkhauli
 Pihuli
 Piprahia
 Punak Buzurg
 Rahtawa
 Ram Punak
 Ramnagar kakaria Dih
 Rampur
 Rampur
 Rampurudho
 Repura
 Sahjaniya
 Saraharwa
 Sarea
 Sarna
 Sham Bodi
 Sobhan Chak
 Sonbarsa
 Tanrwa
 Tariwan
 Tariwani
 Tiar
 Ukrenri

Daraundha 

 Abhui
 Bagaura
 Bahgra
 Baidapur
 Baldih
 Baluhi
 Bangali Bharauli
 Bela
 Beldari tola
 Bhadia
 Bhikhaban
 Bhusi
 Birti tola
 Bishunpura
 Chakri
 Chherahi
 Chintamanpur
 Dahkani
 Daunchhapra
 Dhebar
 Dibi
 Dipni
 Dumri
 Duraundha
 Fatehpur
 Gobindapur
 Harsa toli
 Harsar
 Hathopur
 Inda
 Jagdishpur
 Jalalpur
 Jhajhawa
 Kamsara
 Karsaut
 Katwar
 Khamhoura
 Kharsara
 Kolhua
 Korari Kalan
 Korari Khurd
 Koror
 Kothuasaranpur
 Machhauta
 Machhauti
 Madari Chak
 Mahachawar
 Manchha
 Marsara
 Mathia
 Mathia
 Milki Madhwapur
 Mirachak
 Mundaram Chhapra
 Nanda tola
 Pachhwari Harsar
 Pakwalia
 Panrepur
 Pasiwarh
 Pawat
 Phalpura
 Pipra
 Pirarthu Kalan
 Pirarthu Khurd
 Raini
 Rajapur
 Ramgarha
 Ramsapur
 Rangrauli
 Ranibari
 Rasulpur
 Rukundipur
 Sadhpur
 Sahdauli
 Satjora
 Sherpur
 Sirsaon
 Siwan Bigrah
 Talkhiro
 Terha
 Ujaen
 Usti

Goriakothi 

 Ageyan
 Bahadurpur
 Bahopur
 Barari
 Bardaha
 Barhoga Gangaram
 Barhoga Jaddu
 Barhoga Parsotim
 Bazidpur
 Bhalui
 Bhithi
 Bindwal
 Birti tola
 Chainpur
 Chanauli
  Chanchopali
 Chandpur
 Chhitauli Kalan
 Chhitauli Khurd
 Chithai
 Dagri Mathia
 Dichhitpur
 Dudhra
 Dumra
 Gobindapur
 Gohuan
 Gopalpur
 Gopalpur
 Gorea Kothi
  Goria Kothi
 Hariharpur Kalan
 Hariharpur Khurd
 Harpur
 Hetimpur
 Heyatpur
 Jagarnathpur
 Jagdishpur
 Jagdishpur
 Jalalpur
 Jamo
 Jangal belas
 Kaleanpur
 Karanpura
 Karpalia
 Khagni
 Khulasa
 Laka tola
 Laka tola
 Lala Hata
 Lilaru Aurangabad
 Lilaru Habib
 Mahammadpur
 Mahammadpur
 Majhaulia
 Mathia
 Meghwar
 Mirzapur
 Mustafabad
 Nautan
 Pachpakaria Padumpatti
 Pachpakaria Tulsi
 Pachpatia
 Pahlejpur
 Pipra
 Purandarpur
 Rampur
 Sadipur
 Saidpura
 Sani Basantpur
 Sarari
 Sarea
 Sathwar
 Satwar
 Sauna
 Shekhpura
 Sherpur
 Shiurajpur
 Sisai
 Sultanpur Kalan
 Sultanpur Khurd
 Tola Jalalpur

Guthani 

 Arazi Ekbari
 Arazi Ekwari
 Arazi Inglish
 Arazi Inglish
 Bahelia
 Bahelia
 Bakulari
 Balua
 Bangra
 Barpalia
 Basuhari
 Bauri
 Belaur
 Belauri
 Bhagwanpur
 Bhalua
 Bhalui
 Bharauli
 Bhathahi
 Bhulauli
 Bihari Buzurg
 Bihari Khurd
 Bishunpura
 Biswar
 Chain Chhapra
 Chakia
 Chaumukha Kalan
 Chaumukha Khurd
 Chilamarwa
 Chiraua
 Chit Bisraon
 Chitakhal
 Chorbharia
 Damodra
 Danraila
 Darzi Chak
 Deuria
 Dhanauti
 Dharampur
 Dhaula
 Ekwari
 Gareria
 Geyaspur
 Goharua
 Gothini
 Harpur
 Jamuaon
 Jataur
 Jhajhaur
 Kaleyani
 Karamdaha
 Kareji
 Kelharua
 Khap Jataur
 Khap Lebhri
 Khap Misraulia
 Kharaunti
 Kharkharia
 Khilwa
 Khirauli
 Kishunpura
 Kunresar
 Kurmauli
 Kurmha
 Lachhmipur
 Mairitanr
 Mairitanr Diara
 Majhawalia
 Malchaur
 Mamaur
 Mian Gondi
 Misir Chhapara
 Misrauli
 Nainijor
 Odikhor
 Olia
 Pachnerua
 Pachnerui
 Pachnerui
 Panre Gondi
 Panrepar
 Parari
 Pataua Khurd
 Pataua Lakhraj
 Piparpanti
 Rewasi
 Rimafat Chhapra
 Samatanr
 Sarea
 Sarphora
 Selaur
 Sirkarpur
 Sohagra
 Sohrai
 Sonahula
 Surwar Gondi
 Tali Buzurg
 Tali Khurd
 Talidal Chand
 Tanrwa Khurd
 Tanrwa Tiwari
 Tarka
 Tekania
 Tendua
 Thegwalia

Hasanpura 

 Aranda
 Arjal
 Banri Sarai
 Basantnagar
 Bhekhpurwa
 Bishambharpur
 Chak Damri
 Chakiya
 Chandparsa
 Deipur
 Dhanauti
 Dibi
 Gay Ghat
 Hamid Chak
 Harpur
 Harpur Kotwa
 Hasanpura
 Jalalpur
 Jalalpur
 Jalalpur
 Jhaua
 Kabilpura
 Kabiruddin Chak
 Karmansi
 Khajepur Kalan
 Khajepur Khurd
 Kohrauta
 Laheji
 Laram Chak
 Madhwapur
 Madhwapur
 Mahual
 Malahidih
 Mandrapali
 Mandrauli
 Mathia Bachangir
 Merahi
 Mitwar
 Mohmudpur
 Nizampur
 Pakri
 Parari
 Parauli
 Parsa Harnatanr
 Pasiwarh
 Phalpura
 Piaur
 Pipra
 Puraina
 Rafipur
 Rajanpura
 Rasulpur
 Rukni Urf Manchha Khap
 Sahuli
 Semri
 Shahabaz Chak
 Shekhpura
 Shekhpurwa
 Suraiya
 Tanrila
 Tanrwa
 Telkathu
 Ujraha
 Usri Buzurg
 Usri Khurd

Hussainganj 

 Baghauni
 Bali
 Bararam
 Bindwal
 Chak Hazi
 Chanp
 Chhapiya Buzurg
 Chhapiya Khurd
 Chhata
 Darweshpur
 Dhankhar
  Faridpur
 Fazilpur
 Gopalpur
 Gosopali
 Habibnagar
 Harihans
 Hasanpurwa
  Hathaura
 Hathauri
 Jurkan
 Karhanu
 Khajrauni
 Khanpur Khairanti
 Kharsara
 Machakna
 Mahpur
 Mahual
 Markan
 Nathpur
 Nawalpur
 Paighambarpur
 Pakaulia
 Partappur
 Rashid Chak
 Rasulpur
 Renua
 Salonepur
 Sarea
 Shahbazpur
 Sidhaul
 Singarpatti
 Sonahula
 Surapur
 Tetaria
 Tikri

Lakri Nabiganj 

 Adharpur
 Babnauli
 Bahgra
 Bajarmara
 Bala
 Baldiha
 Barwa Dumri
 Basauli
 Bazidpur
 Bhada Khurd
 Bhopatpur Bharthia
 Dabchhu
 Dumra
 Gopalpur
 Imadpur
 Indauli
 Jagatpur
 Jalalpur
 Kapripur
 Khawaspur
 Khusal Dumri
 Kishunpura
 Lakhanaura
 Lakri
 Madarpur
 Marachi
 Munsepur
 Musahari
 Narharpur
 Pakri
 Parauli
 Saidpur
 Sikatia
 Siktia Khap
 Talimapur
 Talimapur
 Talimapur Birt
 Taya Dumri
 Telia
 Ujjaina

Maharajganj 

 Aphrad
 Bagauchha
 Bagauchha Khurd
 Bajrahia
 Balau
 Balia
 Baliapatti
 Bangra
 Bangra
 Barahia tola
 Bhajua
 Bishunpur Mahuari
 Bishunpura
 Chak Mahmuda
 Chandpur
 Chhotka Teghra
 Dalpatpur
 Dareji
 Deuriya
 Dhanchhuha
 Dhanpura
 Dhobwalia
 Gaur
 Gaur
 Gaur Kathak
 Gaur Rauza
 Gohpur
 Hahwa
 Hajipurwa
 Harkeshpur
 Higauli
 Itahari
 Jagdishpur
 Jagdishpur
 Jalalpur
 Jigrawn
 Kalyanpur
 Kas Deura
 Khamhauri
 Khapura Khanpur
 Kheduchhapra
 Lerua
 Madhopur
 Madhopur
  Maharajganj (NP)
 Manpur
 Mardanpur
 Misraulia
 Nautan
 Pakaulia
 Paterha
 Phalpura
 Pipra Kalan
 Pipra Khurd
 Pokhra
 Rahia
 Ratanpura
 Risaura
 Sarangpur
 Sarea
 Shahganj
 Shahpur
 Shakra
 Shiude
 Sikandarpur
 Siktia
 Sonbarsa
 Surbir
 Takipur
 Teghra
 Teotha
 Ushuri

Mairwa 

 Arazi Inglish
 Atwa
 Babhnauli
 Baraso
 Bargaon
 Barka Manjha
 Bedauli
  Belaspur
 Bhopatpura
 Bishunpura
 Chakia
 Chitmath
 Chup Chupwa
 Dhamaur
 Dharahra
 Dharni Chhapra
 Dhusa
 Domdih
 Dumar Chhapra
 English
 Ghansham Mathia
 Gopal Chak
 Harnathpur
 Kabirpur
 Kabita
 Kaithaulia
 Karjania
 Khap Siswa
 Kolhuwa Dargah
 Kuldipa
 Labhri
 Lachhimipur
 Lashkari Chhapra
  Mairwa (NP)
 Mathia
 Muriyari
 Narahiya
 Nawada
 Parasia
 Parasia Khurd
 Patkhauli
 Pharchhua
 Pharchhuhi
 Pipra
 Semra
 Seni Chhapra
 Sewtapur
  Sirsia
 Siswa Buzurg
 Siswa Khurd
 Sitalpura
 Sumeri Chhapra
 Surad Sahi
 Ugarsen Chhapra

Nautan 

 Agaunta
 Balua
 Balwa
 Bara Shikuara
 Baraipatti
 Basdewa
 Bishambharpur
 Bishunpura
 Dewan Chak
 Galimapur
 Gamhirpur
 Gandharpa
 Gobardhana
 Harpur
 Hathaunji
 Jagdishpur
 Khalwa
 Khap Bankat
 Khap Misrauli
 Kilpur
 Kilpur
 Kurmauta
 Marachhi
 Mathia
 Misir Chak
 Misrauli khas
 Murarpatti
 Narayanpur
 Narayanpur
 Narkatia
 Nautan
 Partappur
 Pipra
 Qadir Chak
 Rahimpur
 Ramgarh
 Rampur
 Sagra
 Semaria
 Semra Buzurg
 Semra Khurd
 Shahpur
 Shahpur Misrauli
 Shikuara
 Siswa
 Tali
 Tirmanpur

Pachrukhi 

 Akopur
 Alapur
 Atarsua
 Babhnauli
 Baisakhi
 Bangra Sirikant
 Banjariya
 Barahani
 Barkagaon
 Bartawalia
 Baryarpur
 Benusar Buzurg
 Bharathpura
 Bhatwalia
 Bhatwalia
 Bijehata
 Budhu Chhapra
 Chak Pasram
 Chandpur
 Chaumukha
 Daroga Hata
 Dihiya
 Dinapatti
 Gamharia
 Garibganj
 Gharthaulia
 Ghorgahiya
 Gopalpur
 Gopipatti
 Gosain Chhapra
 Gotharo
 Hakkam
 Hakma
 Hamdipur
 Hardia
 Hata
 Itwa
 Jasauli Kharag
 Jasauli Pakauli
 Jhunapur
 Kaithi
 Kaleanpur
 Kodai
 Korakhap
 Korar
 Madhwapur
 Mahpur
 Mahuari
 Majhaulia
 Makhnupur
 Malupur
 Matuk Chhapra
 Mithanpura
 Mohammadpur
 Nainpura
 Narayanpur
 Narhat
 Nathanpura
 Nauranga
 Nizampur
 Nuruddinpur
  Pachrukhi
 Pagar Kothi
 Pakhrera
 Pakri Bangali
 Papaur
 Pengwara
 Pipra
 Rampur
 Rasulpur
  Saddikpur
 Sahlaur
 Samopur
 Saraia
 Sarauti
 Siswa
 Sonapipar
 Sota
 Supauli
 Surwala
 Tarwara
 Ukhai purbaripatti
 Ukhaipachhiaripatti
 Walipur

Raghunathpur 

 Abhimanwan
 Adamanpur
 Aima Sukhatpali
 Amhara
 Amwari
 Anwar
 Bahelia
 Bangra
 Bankat Main Chak
 Baraipur
 Baruna
 Basantpur
 Basantpur
 Basantpur Diara
 Basarh
 Belaura Dih
 Belwar
 Bhagwanpur
 Bhanti
 Bharthipatti
 Bhulli Chakri
 Bishundas Chak
 Bishunpura
 Bishunpura
 Chak Daula
 Chak Makhdum Alam
 Chakia
 Chakra
 Chakri
 Chaksultanpur
 Chauri Kalan
 Chhitni Dumri
 Daulatpur
 Deopur
 Dhorhaha
 Diara Bhaw Singh
 Dighwaliya
 Dilawarpur
 Domanpura
 Edilpur
 Elahi Chak
 Firozpur
 Gabhirar
 Gobhirar Diara
 Gonaria
 Gopalpur
 Haibatpur
 Harnathpur
 Harpalpur
 Harpur
 Harpur Diara
 Hasopur
 Jaijori
 Jawanpura
 Jorapur
 Kajrasan
 Kakuliyat
 Kandhauli
 Kanhradhari Haltamah
 Kanrsar
 Kaunsar Diara
 Kausar
 Khap Dhanauti
 Khujwa
 Konhara Dhari Nizamat Diara
 Konhradhari Nizamat
 Kusahra
 Lachhipur
 Lachhuman Dumari
 Lagusa
 Lahladpur
 Lohbara
 Mahazi Diara Kakarghatta
 Mahazi Gondauli
 Mahendar Buzurg
 Mahrauli
 Marwatia
 Mauzachakki Diara Sultanpur
 Mianchandi
 Miran Chak
 Mirpur
 Mirzapur
 Mirzapur
 Mirzapur
 Moti Chak
 Nadiaon
 Narhan
 Narhan Diara
 Navadih
 Nawada
 Nawada Diara
 Newari
 Nigja
 Nikhti Kalan
 Nikhti Khurd
 Nima Dih
 Odakpur
 Pachbarwa
 Padartha
 Panjwar
 Parahia
 Parasram Dumri
 Parasrampur
 Patiaon
 Patiaon Gopi
 Phulwaria
 Pipra
 Raghunath Lahar
  Raghunathpur
 Raiti Chandi
 Rajpur
 Rampur Lattha
 Sadhpur
 Sahimpur
 Saichani
 Saidpur
 Salempur
 Santhi
 Saran Dumri
 Shahpur
 Sitalpur
 Sonbarsa
 Sultanpur
 Surajbalia
 Tallahar
 Tanri
 Ungo

Siswan 

 Alakh Diyara
 Ansar
 Arjanipur
 Baghauna
 Baishistnagar
 Bakhri
 Bangra
 Bangra
 Barauna
 Bawan Dih
 Bhadaur
 Bhagar
 Bhagwanpur
 Bhaisaurha
 Bharwalia
 Bhikhpur
 Bhikhpur Bhagwanpur
 Birti
 Birti Lakheraj
 Chainpur Mobarakpur
 Chak Haibat
 Chandpur
 Chandpur
 Chatar
 Chatea
 Chatea Diara
 Chaturbhujpur
 Chhitauli
 Chungulpura
 Dhorhahi
 Gangapur
 Gayaspur
 Gayaspur Diyara
 Ghurghat
 Gobindpur
 Gopalpur
 Gudi Dih
 Haibatpur
 Harihar Chhapra
 Husena
 Ijra
 Ismail Chak
 Jagdishpur
 Jhotpur
 Kachnar
 Kasarh
 Kathtal
 Kauli Chhapra
 Kishunwari
 Kolhua
 Madhopur
 Madhwapur
 Mahanagar
 Majharia
 Makhnupur
 Manara
 Mathia
 Menhdar
 Misroulia
 Morwan
 Mura Parsotim
 Nagai
 Nagai
 Nagai Khas
 Nanda Mura
 Nawada
 Nawada
 Nawalpur
 Naya Gaon
 Nirmal Nagai
 Noniapatti
 Pachamuwa
 Pachbhinda
 Parari
 Pipra
 Ramgarh
 Rampur
 Rampur
 Sainpur
 Sainpur Diara
 Sarahra
 Saraut
 Siswa Khurd
 Siswan
 Siswan Kalan
 Sonbarsa
 Suahi
 Tarenawa
 Tilauta
 Ubdhi

Siwan 

 Adli
 Adlichak
 Aghaila
 Akhainiyam
 Amlori
 Baghra
 Balchandhata
 Baletha
 Bansopali
 Barhan
 Barhea
 Batrauli
 Benusar
 Bhada Kalan
 Bhada Khurd
 Bhadaura
 Bhanta Pokhar
 Bharthui
 Bhatwalia
 Bishambharpur
 Bishunpur
 Bishunpurwa
 Chakra
 Chanaur
 Chhotpur
 Dewapali
 Dhanauti
 Dharam Makariar
 Gopalpur
 Hari Balmha
 Hasanpurwa
 Hasanpurwa
 Jafra
 Jamsikri
 Jiaen
 Kaira Tal
 Kalinjra
 Karanpura
 Kararua
 Khagaura
  Khalispur
 Khudra
 Lakri Makariar
 Lohsi Kalan
 Lohsi Khurd
 Mahuari
 Majahida(Majahidpur)
 Majhaulia
 Majhwa
 Makariar
 Mardapur
 Mirapur
 Mohammadpur
 Mohiuddinpur
 Molnapur
 Mura
 Nathuchhap
 Naupali
 Orma Makund
 Pachaura
 Pachlakhi
 Paighambarpur
 Pakri Makariar or  Badli
 Pararia
 Phulwaria
 Pithauri
 Puraina
 Ramapali
 Rampur
 Salempur
 Sarabe
 Sarsa
 Sarsar
 Shampur
 Siari
 Sirishtapur
  Siwan
  Siwan (Nagar Parishad)
 Sujaon
 Tahira
 Tanrwa
 Thakur Pachlakhi

Ziradei 

 Akolhi
 Baikunthpur
 Balaipur
 Bangra
 Banthu Salona
 Banthu Sriram
 Bardahan
 Barheya
 Barhulia
 Baroha
 Belwasa
 Berhea
 Bhaisakhal
 Bhalua Makund
 Bhaluwahi
 Bharauli
 Bharthua
 Bharthui
 Bhatkan khem
 Bhikpur
 Bijaipur
 Bikaur
 Bishunpura
 Chandauli Gangauli
 Chandpali
 Chhaprapal
 Chhitanpur
 Chhotka Manjha
 Dharampur
 Fajulhi
 Gangauli
 Garar
 Garar
 Gaziapur Bedaulia
 Gobrahi
 Gonthi
 Hardopatti
 Harpur
 Harpur Madanpur
 Hasanpurwa
 Hasua
 Hir Makriar
 Jamapur
  Jiradei
 Kakarghatti
 Khargi Rampur
 Kishunpur Misrauli
 Mahamudpur
 Mahmudpur
 Majhwalia
 Makundpur
 Manian
 Misrauli  Lakheraj
 Miyan Ke Bhathkan
 Muian
 Munra
 Nandpali
 Narayanpur
 Narindpur
 Pakaulia
 Parasurampur
 Pathardei
 Phulwaria
 Piprahia
 Pokhrera
 Raichanda
 Repura
 Ruia
 Sajna
 Salrapur
 Sanjalpur
 Santhu
 Shakra
 Shankarpur
 Sikia
 Singahi
 Sisahani
 Surujpura
 Surwal
 Thepaha Raja Ram
 Titara

References 

Siwan district

Siwan district